Do It for the Fans is Dok2's latest mixtape which was released on November 15, 2011. This mixtape was released under Dok2's own independent Korean hip hop label, Illionaire Records, which he formed with Beenzino and The Quiett.

Production 
The album consists of twelve tracks, eight of which were produced by Dok2 himself. The mixtape had many other producers. These include AOM's Cha Cha Malone, Illionaire Records' The Quiett, and also Shimmy Twice. It also features many R&B and Korean hip hop artists. These include The Quiett, B-Free, Paloalto and Zion.T.

Track listing

References 

Dok2 albums
2011 mixtape albums